EA Sports Active 2: Personal Trainer is an exercise video game developed by EA Canada. It was released on November 16, 2010 in North America for the Xbox 360, PlayStation 3 and Wii. The Xbox 360 version makes use of Kinect. It is the successor to EA Sports Active, which was released in 2009. On April 13, 2012, EA discontinued the online support for this title.

References

External links

2010 video games
Products and services discontinued in 2012
EA Sports games
Electronic Arts games
Fitness games
Kinect games
PlayStation 3 games
Wii games
Xbox 360 games
Inactive multiplayer online games
Video games developed in Canada